Denise Grahl (born 4 May 1993) is a German Paralympic swimmer.

Career

She represented Germany at the 2016 Summer Paralympics and won a silver medal in the women's 50 metre freestyle S7 event.

At the 2018 World Para Swimming European Championships she won the gold medals in the women's 50 metres freestyle S7, women's 100 metres freestyle S7 and women's 50 metres butterfly S7 events. She also won the silver medal in the women's 400 metres freestyle S7 event.

References

External links 
 
 
 

1993 births
Living people
German female freestyle swimmers
S7-classified Paralympic swimmers
Paralympic swimmers of Germany
Paralympic silver medalists for Germany
Paralympic medalists in swimming
Swimmers at the 2016 Summer Paralympics
Medalists at the 2016 Summer Paralympics
Medalists at the World Para Swimming Championships
Medalists at the World Para Swimming European Championships
Place of birth missing (living people)
German female butterfly swimmers
20th-century German women
21st-century German women